Pultenaea graveolens, commonly known as scented bush-pea, is a species of flowering plant in the family Fabaceae and is endemic to Victoria, Australia. It is a strongly scented shrub with hairy stems, egg-shaped leaves with boat-shaped stipules at the base, and flowers that are mostly yellow.

Description
Flowering occurs in October and the fruit is a hairy egg-shaped pod.

Taxonomy and naming
Pultenaea graveolens was first formally described in 1885 by Ralph Tate in Transactions, proceedings and report, Royal Society of South Australia from specimens he collected near Uraidla in the Mount Lofty Range. The specific epithet (graveolens) means "strongly-smelling".

Distribution and habitat
Scented bush-pea grows in the understorey of forests and occurs in scattered populations north of Melbourne including in the northern Grampians and Brisbane Ranges National Park.

Conservation status
This pultenaea is listed as "vulnerable" under the Victorian Government Flora and Fauna Guarantee Act 1988.

References

graveolens
Flora of Victoria (Australia)
Plants described in 1885
Taxa named by Ralph Tate